Ernst Braun (9 March 1925 – 3 March 2015) was a British-Austrian scholar in technology policy and technology assessment.

Biography 
Born in Vienna as Czechoslovak citizen, Braun grew up in Czechoslovakia. He studied physics at Charles University in Prague (1952 MSc, Dr.rer.nat.), PhD in solid state physics (Bristol 1959). Research in industrial research laboratory, then changed to University career. Appointed professor of physics at Aston University in Birmingham (1967). In 1973 started an interdisciplinary post-graduate research unit, the Technology Policy Unit (TPU). The topics of research embraced all social aspects of technology, including questions of policy, technology assessment, and the process and effects of technological innovation. In the same year Ernest Braun, together with the late Bill Williams and Michael Gibbons founded an interuniversity group known as “Science in a Social Context” (SISCON). This group obtained some funding and hired research fellows who produced teaching texts published by Butterworth. The purpose was to assist in the teaching of social aspects of science and technology to undergraduates in a variety of disciplines. The TPU at Aston University started an MSc course under the title “Social Aspects of Science and Technology” and also recruited several doctoral students. Many of the graduates of the doctoral programme later became professors in British universities. Also David Collingridge, the author of the Collingridge dilemma worked at TPU.
In 1982/83 Braun was visiting professor at Vienna Technical University. In 1984 he retired from Aston University.  and became visiting professor at University of Vienna, followed by several free-lance research projects in Austria. In 1985 he joined the Austrian Academy of Sciences (OAW), where he started a research group on technology assessment. In 1988, this group became the Technology Assessment Unit (FTB), headed by him till his retirement from the OAW in 1991, when he returned to England. Braun was followed by Gunther Tichy and under his leadership the FTB became a fully-fledged Institute of Technology Assessment (ITA). On his return to England, Braun became visiting professor in the Open University in Milton Keynes. When he finally retired in 1994 he lived for five years in Portugal and in 2010 moved to Austria with his wife Doris (née Luttenberger), a painter. He had two daughters from his first marriage, both living in London. He died on 3 March 2015  in Bruckneudorf, just 6 days shy of his 90th birthday.

Achievements 
Braun is regarded as a European pioneer of social studies in science and technology in general, and of technology assessment in particular. In Austria he is regarded as the founder of technology assessment. He has written several books and many journal articles. His best known books are probably Revolution in Miniature (with Stuart Macdonald) 1978, Futile Progress 1995, Technology in Context 1998. His last book, From Need to Greed, The Changing Role of Technology in Society, published in 2010.

Books 
Science and Survival, Butterworth, London 1977 (a SISCON book),  (with David Collingridge).
Revolution in Miniature. Cambridge University Press, Cambridge 1978,  (with Stuart McDonald).
Assessment of Technological Decisions, Butterworth, London 1979 (a SISCON book),  (with David Collingridge and Kate Hinton)
Wayward Technology. Printer, London 1984, .
Futile Progress, Earthscan, London, 1995, .
Technology in Context, Routledge, London, 1998, .
From Need to Greed, Austrian Academy of Sciences Press, Vienna, 2010, .

Notes

External links 
 E. Braun in the ISBN data base
 E. Braun on Google Scholar

Sources 
This short biography is based on an autographic curriculum vitae by E. Braun as well as research carried out at the Institute of Technology Assessment in Vienna, among others published in this article (in German): Nentwich/Peissl, 2005, 20 Jahre Technikfolgenabschätzung in Österreich. In: Nentwich, Michael; Peissl, Walter (Hrsg.), Technikfolgenabschätzung in der österreichischen Praxis, Festschrift für Gunther Tichy; Wien: Verlag der Österreichischen Akadmie der Wissenschaften, pp. 11–32,  PDF; 272 kB. This article is mostly translated from original in the German Wikipedia.

Obituary: "Ernest Braun 1925-2015" 

1925 births
2015 deaths
Scientists in technology assessment and policy
Scientists from Prague
Charles University alumni
Alumni of the University of Bristol
Academics of Aston University
Academic staff of the University of Vienna
Academic staff of TU Wien
Academics of the Open University
Czechoslovak expatriates in Austria
Czechoslovak emigrants to the United Kingdom
British emigrants to Austria